Renato Michell González Castellanos (born October 4, 1988) is a Mexican footballer who currently plays as a midfielder.

External links

Career statistics at BDFA

Living people
1988 births
Club América footballers
C.F. Mérida footballers
Footballers from Mexico City
Global Makati F.C. players
Mexican expatriate footballers
Mexican footballers
Expatriate footballers in the Philippines
Association football midfielders